Llanwrtyd Wells Urban District was an urban district in Brecknockshire in existence 1894-1974, and incorporated into Brecknock Borough Council.

The archives are at Powys County Archives Office .

Urban districts of Wales
Brecknockshire